Parliamentary elections were held in Cameroon on 30 June 2002. The result was a victory for the ruling Cameroon People's Democratic Movement, which won 149 of the 180 seats. In 17 constituencies the result was cancelled by the Supreme Court due to irregularities and the election re-run on 15 September.

Results

References

Cameroon
2002 in Cameroon
Elections in Cameroon
Election and referendum articles with incomplete results
June 2002 events in Africa